In 2017, the Wales national rugby union team's summer tour saw them play test matches against Tonga on 16 June and Samoa on 23 June. The match against Tonga was played in Auckland, New Zealand, due to concerns over the state of Teufaiva Sport Stadium in Nukuʻalofa. Wales won the match 24–6, before beating Samoa 19–17 in Apia.

Squad
With head coach Warren Gatland leading the British & Irish Lions on their tour to New Zealand, assisted by Wales attack coach Rob Howley, forwards coach Robin McBryde was named as coach for the tour to Tonga and Samoa, just as he had been in previous Lions years in 2009 and 2013. Cardiff Blues head coach Danny Wilson and attack coach Matt Sherratt, and Scarlets backs coach Stephen Jones were appointed to McBryde's coaching staff, but Wilson and Jones withdrew before the tour due to club commitments.

The Lions squad included 12 senior Wales players, resulting in 13 uncapped players being named in the 32-man squad for the tour, which was captained by centre Jamie Roberts.

Matches

RGC 1404 v Wales

Tonga v Wales

Samoa v Wales

References

2017 rugby union tours
Wales national rugby union team tours
Rugby union tours of Samoa
Rugby union tours of Tonga